Alexander Petrovich Skaliukh (Russian: Александр Петрович Скалиух, born 15 June 1994) is a Russian Paralympic swimmer. He represented Russian Paralympic Committee athletes at the 2020 Summer Paralympics.

Paralympics
Skaliukh represented Russian Paralympic Committee athletes at the 2020 Summer Paralympics and won a gold medal in the men's 4 × 100 m medley relay and a bronze medal in the 100 metre butterfly S9 event.

References

1994 births
Living people
Sportspeople from Taganrog
Medalists at the World Para Swimming European Championships
Medalists at the World Para Swimming Championships
Paralympic swimmers of Russia
Swimmers at the 2020 Summer Paralympics
Medalists at the 2020 Summer Paralympics
Paralympic medalists in swimming
Paralympic gold medalists for the Russian Paralympic Committee athletes
Paralympic bronze medalists for the Russian Paralympic Committee athletes
Russian male butterfly swimmers
Russian male freestyle swimmers
S9-classified Paralympic swimmers
20th-century Russian people
21st-century Russian people